Enaphalodes cortiphagus is a species of beetle in the family Cerambycidae. It was described by Craighead in 1923.

References

Elaphidiini
Beetles described in 1923